Dadu Tehsil is an administrative subdivision (tehsil) of Dadu District in the Sindh province of Pakistan, the city of Dadu is the capital.

References

Talukas of Sindh
Populated places in Dadu District